Legionella brunensis is a Gram-negative, non-spore-forming, aerobic bacterium from the genus Legionella, which was isolated from cooling tower water in Czechoslovakia.

References

External links
Type strain of Legionella brunensis at BacDive -  the Bacterial Diversity Metadatabase

Legionellales
Bacteria described in 1989